Jedenácté přikázání, also known as The Eleventh Commandment', is a Czech comedy film directed by Martin Frič. It was released in 1935.

Cast
 Hugo Haas - Jiri Voborsky
 Jiřina Štěpničková - Emma Kralickova Voborska
 Jindřich Plachta - Emanuel Strela
 Jirí Plachý - Milos Jicinsky
 Truda Grosslichtová - Julie Kralickova
 Theodor Pištěk - Florian Kralicek
 Milada Gampeová - Veronika Kralickova
 Marie Becvárová - Frantiska
 Václav Trégl - Bartolomej Pecka
 Ella Nollová - Elizbeta Vanousova Peckova
 Jára Kohout - Rousek
 Karel Hašler - The Police Captain
 Jaroslav Marvan - Starosta mesta
 Betty Kysilková - Big Wife at Club Table
 Alois Dvorský - Little Husband at Club Table

References

External links
 

1935 films
1935 comedy films
Czechoslovak black-and-white films
Films directed by Martin Frič
Czechoslovak comedy films
1930s Czech films